Schwarze Messe is the fourth album of Untoten.

Track listing
"Lilith"– 5:22
"Die Freundlose Gasse"– 0:47
"Tanz der Hexen"– 4:26
"Desdemona"– 5:56
"Nekrolog"– 0:51
"Black Blood"– 6:01
"Gunshot Wounds"– 0:55
"Church of Littleton"– 8:57
"Seraphine"– 4:13
"Autumnal Equinox (Schwarze Messe)"– 5:50

Info
 All tracks written and produced by David A. Line
 Male vocals by David A. Line
 Female vocals by Greta Csatlós

External links
 Untoten Discography Info

1999 albums
Untoten albums